Beveland may refer to:
Noord-Beveland, Netherlands
Zuid-Beveland, Netherlands